Kandri is a census town in Nagpur district in the Indian state of Maharashtra.

Geography
It has an average elevation of 311 metres (1020 feet).

Demographics
 India census, Kandri had a population of 8125. Males constitute 52% of the population and females 48%. Kandri has an average literacy rate of 72%, higher than the national average of 59.5%: male literacy is 78%, and female literacy is 66%. In Kandri, 12% of the population is under 6 years of age.

References

Cities and towns in Nagpur district